The Sowerby by-election was a Parliamentary by-election held on 2 July 1904. The constituency returned one Member of Parliament (MP) to the House of Commons of the United Kingdom, elected by the first past the post voting system.

Vacancy
John William Mellor had been Liberal MP for the seat of Sowerby since the 1892 General Election. Aged 69, he chose to retire from parliament.

Electoral history
The seat had been Liberal since creation in 1885. They easily held the seat at the last election, with a reduced majority:

Candidates
The local Liberal Association selected 47 year-old Accrington businessman, John Sharp Higham as their candidate to defend the seat. He was Mayor of Accrington from 1899–1901. The local Conservative Association selected 24 year-old William Simpson-Hinchliffe as their candidate.

Result
The Liberals held the seat from the Conservatives:

Aftermath
At the following General Election the result was:

References

1904 in England
1904 elections in the United Kingdom
Elections in Calderdale
By-elections to the Parliament of the United Kingdom in West Yorkshire constituencies
July 1904 events